Burns Commons is a park in the Milwaukee County Parks system. It is located on the East Side of the city, bound by Franklin Pl., Prospect Ave., and Ogden Ave. It is split into two sections by Knapp Street. The larger, northern section is landscaped with trees, lawn and walkways, and includes public art. The smaller southern portion holds a statue of Scottish poet Robert Burns.

History 
In 1847, developer James H. Rogers donated the land to the city, making it one of Milwaukee's earliest parks. At the time it was named First Ward Park. It was later named Franklin Square. As stately homes were built around the park, four of the neighboring homeowners took on its upkeep. They provided landscaping and built a fountain. By the turn of the century, the park was known as Baby Park, since the nursemaids in the affluent neighborhood took their charges to the pleasant park.

In 1909 a statue of Robert Burns was donated by Scottish immigrant James Anderson Bryden and erected on the south end of the park. Its dedication was on June 26, 1909. The bronze statue, set on a plinth of Nova Scotia granite, was designed by Scottish sculptor William Grant Stevenson.

In 1937, the parks of the city and of the county of Milwaukee were consolidated into the Milwaukee County Parks system. At that time, the park became known as Robert Burns Triangle. This was not official, however, since a deed restriction required the name to be kept Franklin Square. In 1994 the restriction was removed, and the park was officially renamed.

As of 2019 the Milwaukee Streetcar M-Line begins and ends on the north-east side of the park at the intersection of East Ogden Avenue and North Prospect Avenue.

See also 
Robert Burns statue
Parks of Milwaukee

References 

Protected areas of Milwaukee County, Wisconsin
Geography of Milwaukee
Urban public parks